The 1986 Calder Cup playoffs of the American Hockey League began on April 9, 1986. The eight teams that qualified, four from each division, played best-of-seven series for Division Semifinals and Division Finals. The division champions played a best-of-seven series for the Calder Cup.  The Calder Cup Final ended on May 21, 1986, with the Adirondack Red Wings defeating the Hershey Bears four games to two to win the Calder Cup for the second time in team history. Hershey's Tim Tookey won the Jack A. Butterfield Trophy as AHL playoff MVP, becoming the first player from the losing finalist to win the award.

Playoff seeds
After the 1985–86 AHL regular season, the top four teams from each division qualified for the playoffs. The Hershey Bears finished the regular season with the best overall record.

Northern Division
Adirondack Red Wings - 90 points
Maine Mariners - 89 points
Moncton Golden Flames - 80 points
Fredericton Express - 78 points

Southern Division
Hershey Bears - 99 points
Binghamton Whalers - 87 points
St. Catharines Saints - 81 points
New Haven Nighthawks - 79 points

Bracket

In each round, the team that earned more points during the regular season receives home ice advantage, meaning they receive the "extra" game on home-ice if the series reaches the maximum number of games. There is no set series format due to arena scheduling conflicts and travel considerations.

Division Semifinals 
Note: Home team is listed first.

Northern Division

(1) Adirondack Red Wings vs. (4) Fredericton Express

(2) Maine Mariners vs. (3) Moncton Golden Flames

Southern Division

(1) Hershey Bears vs. (4) New Haven Nighthawks

(2) Binghamton Whalers vs. (3) St. Catharines Saints

Division Finals

Northern Division

(1) Adirondack Red Wings vs. (3) Moncton Golden Flames

Southern Division

(1) Hershey Bears vs. (3) St. Catharines Saints

Calder Cup Final

(S1) Hershey Bears vs.(N1) Adirondack Red Wings

See also
1985–86 AHL season
List of AHL seasons

References

Calder Cup
Calder Cup playoffs